Just deserts are things deserved.

Just deserts may also refer to:
Just deserts (law)
Just Deserts, a novel by Eric Walters

See also
Just Desserts (disambiguation)